Pokrovskoye is a rural locality (a village) in Kubenskoye Rural Settlement, Vologodsky District, Vologda Oblast, Russia. The population was 16 as of 2002.

Geography 
Pokrovskoye is located 46 km northwest of Vologda (the district's administrative centre) by road. Berezhok is the nearest rural locality.

References 

Rural localities in Vologodsky District